Bohol local elections were held on May 9, 2022, as part of the 2022 Philippine general election. Registered voters elected leaders for local positions: the governor, vice-governor, as well as three to four members of the Sangguniang Panlalawigan, and three representatives for the three districts of Bohol, city or town mayor, vice mayor and councilors.

Based on the COMELEC's data, the province 2022 voting population is 949,791; increased by 5.69%, equivalent to 51,109 additional electorate from the 2019 elections voter count of 898,682, making Bohol the 20th vote-rich province in the country.

42 candidates submitted certificates of candidacy (COC) between October 1 and 8, 2021, for a total of 15 provincial and congressional seats.

On May 10, 2022, the Provincial Board of Canvassers proclaimed Abante Bohol tandem Erico Aristotle Aumentado and Dionisio Victor Balite as the newly elected governor and vice-governor of Bohol respectively.

Provincial elections

Governor
Electorate (2022): 949,791 (1,723 election returns)
Turnout (2022): 837,470 (88.17%) 
Last termer congressman Aris Aumentado won via landslide against the incumbent governor Arthur C. Yap.

 Died on March 12, 2022 and cannot be substituted since she ran as Independent.

Vice-Governor

Electorate (2022): 949,791 (1,723 election returns)
Turnout (2022): 837,470 (88.17%)
Senior board member Dionisio Victor Balite won against the incumbent Rene Relampagos.

Sangguniang Panlalawigan

Parties are as stated in their certificates of candidacy.

1st District
Electorate (2022):  316,471 (560 election returns) 
 Turnout (2022): 280,232 (88.51%)

|bgcolor=black colspan=5|

 Substituted Dalia Melda Tirol-Magno (NPC), who withdrew her candidacy on November 9, 2021.
.

2nd District
Electorate (2022):  312,434 (553 election returns)
Turnout (2022): 275,219 (88.06%)

|bgcolor=black colspan=5|

 Substituted Jesseril Intina (PDP-Laban).
.

3rd District
Electorate (2022):  320,786 (610 election returns) 
Turnout (2022): 282,019 (87.91%)

|bgcolor=black colspan=5|

 Substituted Stefan Lee Cagulada (NPC)

Congressional elections
Parties are as stated in their certificates of candidacy.

1st District
City: Tagbilaran City
Municipality: Alburquerque, Antequera, Baclayon, Balilihan, Calape, Catigbian, Corella, Cortes, Dauis, Loon, Maribojoc, Panglao, Sikatuna, Tubigon
Population (2020):  470,599
Electorate (2022): 316,471 (560 election returns)
Turnout (2022): 280,232 (88.55%)
Incumbent Edgar Chatto was reelected.

2nd District
City: none
Municipality: Bien Unido, Buenavista, Clarin, Dagohoy, Danao, Getafe, Inabanga, Pres. Carlos P. Garcia, Sagbayan, San Isidro, San Miguel, Talibon, Trinidad, Ubay
Population (2020):  471,025
Electorate (2022): 312,534 (553 election returns)
Turnout (2022): 275,219 (88.06%)
Erico Aristotle Aumentado was term limited. He ran for governor and won. His wife, Maria Vanessa Cadorna-Aumentado, became the first congresswoman ever elected in the Bohol's 2nd District, and third congresswoman elected in the province after Venice Borja-Agana in 1987 and Kristine Alexie Besas-Tutor in 2019.

3rd District
City: none
Municipality: Alicia, Anda, Batuan, Bilar, Candijay, Carmen, Dimiao, Duero, Garcia Hernandez, Guindulman, Jagna, Lila, Loay, Loboc, Mabini, Pilar, Sevilla, Sierra Bullones, Valencia
Population (2020):  452,705
Electorate (2022): 320,786 (610 election returns)
Turnout (2022): 282,019 (87.91%)
Incumbent Kristine Alexie Besas-Tutor was reelected.

City and municipal elections
All municipalities of Bohol and Tagbilaran City elected mayors, vice-mayors and councilors this election. The mayor and vice mayor with the highest number of votes win the seat; they are voted separately, therefore, they may be of different parties when elected.

First District

Alburquerque
Electorate (2022): 7,775 (13 election returns)
Turnout (2022):  6,997 (89.99%)
Incumbent mayor Don Ritchie Buates was reelected, while incumbent vice-mayor Jet Jose Ugduracion Jr. failed on his reelection bid.

Antequera
Electorate (2022): 10,139 (23 election returns)
Turnout (2022):  9,273 (91.46%)
Incumbent vice-mayor Jose Mario Pahang won against incumbent mayor Lilioso Nunag.

Baclayon
Electorate (2022): 14,180 (26 election returns)
Turnout (2022):  12,532 (88.38%)
Incumbents Benecio Uy and Romulo Balangkig were reelected.

: Substituted Ma. Judith Israel

Balilihan
Electorate (2022): 14,669 (32 election returns) 
Turnout (2022):  13,429 (91.55%)
Incumbent mayor Pureza Chatto was reelected against incumbent vice-mayor Adonis Roy Olalo.

Calape
Electorate (2022): 22,819 (45 election returns)
Turnout (2022):  20,150 (88.30%)
Former vice-governor Julius Caesar Herrera won against incumbent mayor Nelson Yu. Yu's brother incumbent vice-mayor Sulpicio Yu Jr. was reelected.

:Substituted Joseph Allan Dumalag
:Substituted Hananera Rasonabe Bonggot

Catigbian
Electorate (2022): 16,269 (30 election returns)
Turnout (2022):  14,558 (89.48%)
Incumbents Elizabeth Mandin-Pace and Esteban Angilan Jr. were reelected.

Corella
Electorate (2022): 6,084 (11 election returns)
Turnout (2022):  5,562 (91.42%)
Juan Manuel Lim defeated incumbent mayor Hilario Tocmo. Meanwhile, incumbent vice-mayor Ma. Asuncion Banal-Daquio was term-limited.

Cortes
Electorate (2022): 11,748 (22 election returns)
Turnout (2022):  10,595 (90.19%)
Incumbent mayor Lynn Iven Lim was reelected while incumbent vice-mayor Leo Pabutoy failed on his reelection bid.

Dauis
Electorate (2022): 31,781 (47 election returns)
Turnout (2022):  27,908 (87.81%)
Incumbents Marietta Tocmo-Sumaylo and Luciano Bongalos were term limited. Sumaylo ran for vice-mayor and won.

Loon
Electorate (2022): 30,156 (75 election returns)
Turnout (2022):  26,563 (88.09%)
Incumbents Elvi Peter Relampagos and Lloyd Peter Lopez were reelected.

Maribojoc
Electorate (2022): 14,759 (29 election returns)
Turnout (2022):  13,303 (90.13%)
Incumbents Romulo Manuta and Emilio Castilla were reelected.

Panglao
Electorate (2022): 28,052 (41 election returns)
Turnout (2022):  24,113 (85.96%)
Incumbents mayor Leonila Paredes-Montero was term limited while incumbent vice mayor Briccio Velasco failed on his reelection.

Sikatuna
Electorate (2022): 5,141 (12 election returns)
Turnout (2022):  4,600 (89.48%)
Incumbents Justiniana Ellorimo and Olimpio Calimpusan were unopposed.

Tagbilaran City
Electorate (2022): 70,254 (97 election returns)
Turnout (2022):  61,821 (88.00%)
Both incumbents mayor John Geesnell Yap and vice-mayor Jose Antonio Veloso, were term limited. Yap chose not to run while Veloso ran for mayor against Yap's wife Jane. Jane Censoria Cajes–Yap and Adam Relson Jala became the newly elected mayor and vice-mayor of city, and winning it by landslide. Jane Yap also became the youngest (at age 32), the first city lady mayor to be elected and the 2nd city lady mayor after Carmen Gatal, who was then an appointed OIC city mayor from December 2-6, 1987.

 Substituted his son Dan Ismael Lim (PMP), who withdrew his candidacy on November 15, 2021.

Tubigon
Electorate (2022): 32,645 (57 election returns)
Turnout (2022):  28,828 (88.31%)
Incumbents William Richard Jao and Renato Villaber were reelected.

Second District

Bien Unido
Electorate (2022): 18,684 (30 election returns)
Turnout (2022):  16,241 (86.92%)
Incumbent mayor Rene Borenaga was reelected but incumbent vice-mayor Ramon Arcenal failed on his reelection bid.

Buenavista
Electorate (2022): 22,032 (40 election returns)
Turnout (2022):  19,479 (88.41%)
Incumbent mayor Dave Duallo was reelected against incumbent vice-mayor Ma. Christine Cabarrubias Torregosa.

Clarin
Electorate (2022): 16,375 (32 election returns)
Turnout (2022):  14,706 (89.81%)
Incumbent mayor Eugeniano Ibarra won against incumbent vice mayor Allen Ray Piezas.

Dagohoy
Electorate (2022): 13,425 (23 election returns)
Turnout (2022):  11,999 (89.38%)
Incumbent mayor Sofronio Apat was term-limited while incumbent vice-mayor Ma. Shirley Abulag-Amodia failed on her reelection bid.

Danao
Electorate (2022): 13,834 (25 election returns) 
Turnout (2022):  12,019 (86.88%)
Incumbents Jose Cepedoza and Albert Vitor were reelected. Cepedoza was unopposed.

Getafe
Electorate (2022): 21,499 (38 election returns) 
Turnout (2022):  19,265 (89.61%)
Incumbent mayor Casey Shaun Camacho run for vice-mayor and won while his brother, former mayor Cary Camacho regained his former position as mayor. Vice-mayor Eduardo Torremocha chose not to run.

Inabanga
Electorate (2022): 31,877 (62 election returns)
Turnout (2022):  27,591 (86.55%)
Incumbent mayor Josephine Socorro Jumamoy was term-limited. She ran for vice-mayor and won.

Pres. Carlos P. Garcia
Electorate (2022): 16,793 (33 election returns)
Turnout (2022):  14,556 (86.68%)
Incumbent mayor Fernando Estavilla was reelected but incumbent vice mayor Nestor Abad failed on his reelection bid.

Sagbayan
Electorate (2022): 16,758 (32 election returns)
Turnout (2022):  14,890 (88.85%)
Incumbents Restituto Suarez III and Asuncion Bautista-Ybañez were reelected.

San Isidro
Electorate (2022): 7,246 (15 election returns) 
Turnout (2022):  6,478 (89.40%)
Incumbents mayor Diosdado Gementiza Jr. and Filemon Mantabute were reelected.

San Miguel
Electorate (2022): 17,329 (31 election returns)
Turnout (2022):  14,897 (85.97%)
Incumbent mayor Virgilio Mendez did not seek for reelection. On the other hand, incumbent vice-mayor Faustino Bulaga  was unopposed.

Talibon
Electorate (2022): 42,762 (65 election returns)
Turnout (2022):  37,737 (88.25%)
Incumbents Janette Garcia and Dave Evangelista were reelected.

Trinidad
Electorate (2022): 23,715 (41 election returns)
Turnout (2022):  20,833 (87.85%)
Incumbents Judith del Rosario-Cajes and Manuel Garcia were term limited. Cajes was substituted by her husband, former congressman and mayor Roberto Cajes.

Ubay
Electorate (2022): 50,205 (86 election returns)
Turnout (2022):  44,528 (88.69%)
Incumbents Constantino Reyes and Victor Bonghanoy were reelected.

Third District

Alicia
Electorate (2022): 17,111 (28 election returns)
Turnout (2022):  15,161 (88.60%)
Incumbent vice-mayor Marnilou Ayuban won against incumbent mayor Victoriano Torres III.

Anda
Electorate (2022): 13,817 (26 election returns)
Turnout (2022):  12,092 (87.52%)
Former mayor Angelina Blanco Simacio won against incumbent mayor Metodio Amper. Meanwhile, incumbent vice mayor Nilo Bersabal was reelected.

Batuan
Electorate (2022): 9,920 (19 election returns)
Turnout (2022):  8,914 (89.86%)
Incumbent mayor Antonino Jumawid  was reelected while incumbent vice mayor Precious Joy Dumagan-Baguio failed.

Bilar
Electorate (2022): 13,418 (27 election returns)
Turnout (2022):  12,091 (90.11%)
Incumbent vice-mayor Norman Palacio won against incumbent mayor Manuel Jayectin.

Candijay
Electorate (2022): 21,628 (38 election returns)
Turnout (2022):  19,073 (88.19%)
Incumbent mayor Christopher Tutor was term limited. He ran for vice-mayor and won.

Carmen
Electorate (2022): 35,225 (55 election returns)
Turnout (2022):  30,668 (87.06%)
Incumbent mayor Ricardo Francisco Toribio was term limited. Meanwhile, incumbent vice-mayor Romeo Carbonilla Bigay Jr. was unopposed.

Dimiao
Electorate (2022): 11,141 (35 election returns)
Turnout (2022):  9,704 (87.10%)
Incumbent mayor Randolph Ang won against incumbent vice mayor Gilberto Lagua.

Duero
Electorate (2022): 14,109 (28 election returns)
Turnout (2022):  12,537 (88.86%)
Incumbent mayor Conrada Castino-Amparo was term limited. She vied for vice-mayor against the incumbent Gillian Ranga Achacoso but both were unsuccessful.

Garcia Hernandez
Electorate (2022): 18,085 (37 election returns)
Turnout (2022):  14,928 (82.54%)
Incumbent mayor Tita Baja-Gallentes was term limited. She to ran in Sanguniang Panlalawigan and won with the highest vote. Meanwhile, incumbent vice mayor Miguelito Galendez seek for reelection but failed.

Guindulman
Electorate (2022): 24,148 (40 election returns)
Turnout (2022):  21,135 (87.52%)
Incumbent mayor Ma. Fe Añana-Piezas was term limited; she ran for vice mayor and won. 
Incumbent vice-mayor Martin Lagura Jr. failed on his bid for mayor of the town.

Jagna
Electorate (2022): 24,338 (47 election returns)
Turnout (2022):  21,753 (89.38%)
Incumbent mayor Joseph Rañola won against incumbent vice-mayor Theodore Abrenilla.

Lila
Electorate (2022): 7,780 (18 election returns)
Turnout (2022):  6,975 (89.65%)
Incumbents Arturo Piollo II and Regina Cahiles-Salazar were reelected.

Loay
Electorate (2022): 12,917 (27 election returns)
Turnout (2022):  11,147 (86.30%)
Incumbents Hilario  Ayuban and Rodrigo Cubarol Jr.were reelected. Cubarol was unopposed.

Loboc
Electorate (2022): 13,855 (31 election returns)
Turnout (2022):  12,541 (90.52%)
Incumbent mayor Leon Calipusan did not seek for reelection. Vice-mayor Pablio Sumampong was term limited and ran for board member of the district.

Mabini
Electorate (2022): 19,861 (36 election returns)
Turnout (2022):  17,601 (88.62%)
Incumbents Juanito Jayoma and Renato Tutor were both unsuccessful on their reelection bids.

Pilar
Electorate (2022): 19,243 (32 election returns)
Turnout (2022):  16,906 (87.86%)
Former mayor Wilson Pajo unseated incumbent mayor Necitas Tabaranza Cubrado in a tight race. Meanwhile, incumbent vice mayor Eugenio Datahan II was reelected.

Sevilla
Electorate (2022): 8,146 (15 election returns)
Turnout (2022):  7,286 (89.44%)
Incumbents Juliet Bucag-Dano and Richard Bucag were reelected.

Sierra Bullones
Electorate (2022): 17,853 (32 election returns)
Turnout (2022):  15,452 (86.55%)
Incumbent mayor Simplicio Maestrado was term limited. She ran for vice-mayor and won. Incumbent vice-mayor Rey Yamaro ran for mayor but unsuccessful.

Valencia
Electorate (2022): 18,191 (39 election returns)
Turnout (2022):  16,055 (88.26%)
Incumbent mayor Maria Katrina was term-limited, she ran for district representative. Meanwhile, incumbent second-termer vice-mayor Calixto Garcia ran for councilor instead but failed to secure a seat.

 Substituted Adelwisa Nambatac (NP).

Notes

References

External links 
 COMELEC - Official website of the Philippine Commission on Elections (COMELEC)
 NAMFREL - Official website of National Movement for Free Elections (NAMFREL)
 PPCRV - Official website of the Parish Pastoral Council for Responsible Voting (PPCRV)

2022 Philippine local elections
May 2022 events in the Philippines